Nationality words link to articles with information on the nation's poetry or literature (for instance, Irish or France).

Events
October 26 - Phillis Wheatley sends a poem and letter to General George Washington in his honor. He responded to her in 1776.

Works published

Colonial America
 Anna Young Smith, published under the pen name "Sylvia", "An Elegy to the Memory of the America Volunteers", published in the Pennsylvania Magazine, Colonial America
 Philip Freneau:
 "General Gage's Soliloquy"
 "General Gage's Confession"
 "A Voyage to Boston"
 "American Liberty"
 "A Political Litany"
 John Trumbull, first two cantos of M'Fingal, a satire on American Tories during the American Revolution (later published in completed form in 1782)

United Kingdom
 Hester Chapone, Miscellanies in Prose and Verse
 George Crabbe, Inebriety, published anonymously
 Hugh Downman, The Drama
 Thomas Gray, The Poems of Mr. Gray, to which are Prefixed Memoirs of his Life and Writings by W. Mason, M.A., Annotated letters of Thomas Gray, comments by Mason on the poems; York: A. Ward; criticism and biography
 Edward Jerningham, The Fall of Mexico
 Mary Robinson, Poems
 Richard Savage, The Works of Richard Savage, edited by Samuel Johnson, with a life of Savage by Johnson, later reprinted in Johnson's Prefaces [...] to the Works of the English Poets 1779 (see also An Account of the Life of Mr. Richard Savage 1744)

Births
Death years link to the corresponding "[year] in poetry" article:
 January 30 – Walter Savage Landor (died 1864), English writer and poet
 February 10 – Charles Lamb (died 1834), English writer and poet
 February 12 – Charles Lloyd (died 1839), English poet, friend of Lamb
 March 24 – Muthuswami Dikshitar (died 1835), South Indian poet and composer
 June 15 – Carlo Porta (died 1821), Italian poet
 July 9 – Matthew Lewis ("Monk Lewis") (died 1818), English Gothic novelist and dramatist
 July 11 – Joseph Blanco White, born José María Blanco Crespo (died 1841), Spanish-born theologian and poet writing in English
 August 31 – Agnes Bulmer (died 1836), English poet
 September 8 – John Leyden (died 1811), Scottish orientalist
 December 16 – Jane Austen (died 1817), English novelist and poet

Deaths
Birth years link to the corresponding "[year] in poetry" article:
 March 21 – Samuel Boyce, English engraver, dramatist and poet
 October 2 – Fukuda Chiyo-ni, or Kaga no Chiyo, 千代尼 (born 1703), Japanese woman poet of the Edo period, prominent writer of haiku
 Approximate date – Ramprasad Sen (born 1718/23), Bengali Shakta poet

See also

 List of years in poetry
 List of years in literature
 18th century in poetry
 18th century in literature
 French literature of the 18th century
 Sturm und Drang (the conventional translation is "Storm and Stress"; a more literal translation, however, might be "storm and urge", "storm and longing", "storm and drive" or "storm and impulse"), a movement in German literature (including poetry) and music from the late 1760s through the early 1780s
 List of years in poetry
 Poetry

Notes

18th-century poetry
Poetry